Vladislav Valeryevich Mylnikov, born 12 September 2000) is a Russian left-handed foil fencer and 2021 team Olympic silver medalist.

Medal record

Olympic Games

World Cup

References

Living people
Russian male fencers
Olympic medalists in fencing
Olympic fencers of Russia
Fencers at the 2020 Summer Olympics
Medalists at the 2020 Summer Olympics
2000 births
Olympic silver medalists for the Russian Olympic Committee athletes
21st-century Russian people